Tatara may refer to:

General uses
 Bond (Chinese constellation), one of White Tiger's Stars
 Tatara Bridge, a bridge on the Shimanami Kaidō connecting Hiroshima Prefecture and Ehime Prefecture in Japan
 Tatara (furnace), from the Japanese word for bellows
 Tatara (ship), a small traditional canoe of the Yami people

People
 Tatara (clan), a Manchu clan
 Kacper Tatara, a Polish soccer player
 Tatara (Fushigi Yūgi), a fictional character of the manga Fushigi Yūgi authored by Watase Yuu
 Tatara, the disguised name of the fictional female protagonist Sarasa, or the name of her brother, in the manga Basara authored by Tamura Yumi